Mohamed Saad Marzooq Almla Marzooq Al-Romaihi (born 9 September 1990) is a Bahraini professional footballer who currently plays as a forward for Manama club and the Bahrain national team.

Career
On 8 December 2019, Al Romaihi scored the winning goal for Bahrain in a 1–0 win against Saudi Arabia, which granted them their first Gulf Cup title in the 24th Arabian Gulf Cup.

International career

International goals
Scores and results list Bahrain's goal tally first.

Honours

Club
Hidd SCC
 Bahraini Super Cup: 2015
Bahrain SC
 Bahraini 2nd Division: (Runner-up) 2013–14

International
Bahrain
 WAFF Championship: 2019
 Arabian Gulf Cup: 2019

Individual
 Bahrain First Division League top scorer: 2015–16

References

External links 
 

1990 births
Living people
2019 AFC Asian Cup players
Bahraini footballers
Bahrain international footballers
Bahrain SC players
East Riffa Club players
Hidd SCC players
Riffa SC players
Sportspeople from Manama
Association football forwards
Footballers at the 2010 Asian Games
Asian Games competitors for Bahrain
Bahrain youth international footballers